Colonel Hamish Stephen de Bretton-Gordon  (born September 1963) is a chemical weapons expert and was a director of SecureBio Limited until its dissolution on 17 August 2017. He was formerly a British Army officer for 23 years and commanding officer of the UK's Joint Chemical, Biological, Radiological and Nuclear Regiment and NATO's Rapid Reaction CBRN Battalion. He is a visiting lecturer in disaster management at Bournemouth University. He attended Tonbridge School and has a degree in agriculture from the University of Reading (1987).

He has commented on chemical and biological weapons for the BBC, ABC and The Guardian.

Military service
On 4 January 1988, while being sponsored through university by the British Army as a university candidate, de Bretton-Gordon was commissioned as a second lieutenant (on probation) in the Royal Tank Regiment. In September 1988, his commission was confirmed: he was given seniority in the rank of subaltern (second lieutenant) from 10 August 1985, and promoted to subaltern (lieutenant) backdated to 4 January 1988 with seniority from 10 August 1987. He transferred from a short service commission to a regular commission on 29 January 1991, and was promoted to captain on 10 August 1991. In 1991, he saw active service in Iraq with the 14th/20th King's Hussars as part of the First Gulf War.

After attending the Australian Command and Staff College, he was promoted to major on 30 September 1995. He was promoted to lieutenant colonel on 30 June 2003. In 2004, rather than receiving the command of a tank regiment as he'd expected, he was appointed commanding officer of the UK's Joint Chemical, Biological, Radiological and Nuclear Regiment. In preparation for the command, he studied for a diploma in chemical biology at the Royal Military College of Science. In the 2005 New Year Honours, he was appointed Officer of the Order of the British Empire (OBE). He additionally commanded NATO's Rapid Reaction CBRN Battalion between 2005 and 2007. He was promoted to colonel on 30 June 2007. From 2007 to 2010, he was based at HQ Land Command as assistant director intelligence, surveillance and reconnaissance. He retired from the British Army on 12 September 2011.

See also
 Alastair Hay

References

External links
 

Chief operating officers
Royal Tank Regiment officers
Chemical warfare
Officers of the Order of the British Empire
Academics of Bournemouth University
Alumni of the University of Reading
People educated at Tonbridge School
1963 births
Living people
Graduates of the Staff College, Camberley
British Army personnel of the Gulf War